Shiravand (also Romanized as Shīrāvand; also known as Jūb Shahr) is a village in Helilan Rural District, Helilan District, Chardavol County, Ilam Province, Iran. At the 2006 census, its population was 1,150, in 224 families. The village is populated by Kurds with a Lur minority.

References 

Populated places in Chardavol County
Kurdish settlements in Ilam Province
Luri settlements in Ilam Province